The Focke-Wulf Flitzer ("streaker" or "dasher", sometimes incorrectly translated as "madcap") was a jet fighter under development in Germany at the end of World War II.

Development
The design, also called Entwurf VI, had a central fuselage and two booms carrying the rear control surfaces, having great similarity with the contemporary de Havilland Vampire. It also had the air inlets still positioned on either side of the nose, just below the cockpit.

The estimated horizontal speed was not satisfactory and Flitzer was revised whereby the jet intakes were situated in the wing roots. Further improvements included a narrower fuselage and a changed pilot's canopy. In order to improve the rate of climb, a Walter HWK 109-509 hypergolic liquid-propellant rocket was built in to give supplementary thrust. A complete mockup was built and all construction and assembly plans were finished, but the aircraft was not accepted by the Reich Air Ministry (Reichsluftfahrtministerium, RLM).

Although referred to as Fw 272 in some sources, the Flitzer was never given an RLM designation, and the putative designation "Fw 272" is derived from drawing Nr. 272 for the Flitzer.

Specifications (design draft of 15 September 1944)

See also
Emergency Fighter Program

References

Bibliography

External links

Luftwaffe Projects (In Russian)

Abandoned military aircraft projects of Germany
Flitzer
Twin-boom aircraft
Mid-wing aircraft
Single-engined jet aircraft
Aircraft with auxiliary rocket engines